Maragheh County is in East Azerbaijan province, Iran. The capital of the county is the city of Maragheh. At the 2006 census, the county's population was 227,635 in 57,612 households. The following census in 2011 counted 247,681 people in 70,842 households. At the 2016 census, the county's population was 262,604 in 80,261 households.

Administrative divisions

The population history of Maragheh County's administrative divisions over three consecutive censuses is shown in the following table. The latest census shows two districts, six rural districts, and two cities.

References

 

Counties of East Azerbaijan Province